Dottsy Brodt Dwyer (born April 6, 1953 in Seguin, Texas, United States) is an American country music singer. She grew up in Seguin. Between 1975 and 1981, she recorded as Dottsy for the RCA Records label. During that timespan, she charted thirteen cuts on the Billboard Hot Country Songs chart, including the Top Ten "(After Sweet Memories) Play Born to Lose Again." Four of her other songs reached Top 20 on the same chart.

She returned to her hometown where her family has deep roots. She married and took time off needed to raise her children, while being active in local groups. After her children finished college, Dottsy signed with Heart of Texas Records and in 2010 released an album entitled Meet Me in Texas. She has been performing on a circuit of mostly small towns in Texas, usually touring with other artists from the label.

Dottsy's favorite venue is the Texas Theatre in Seguin, an 80-year-old one-time movie house. She helped the Seguin Conservation Society raise funds to restore the small movie palace.

Discography

Albums

Singles

References

1953 births
American women country singers
American country singer-songwriters
Living people
Singer-songwriters from Texas
People from Seguin, Texas
RCA Records artists
Country musicians from Texas